Prof Olaf Holtedahl ForMemRS FRSE (24 June 1885 – 26 August 1975) was a Norwegian geologist  (Dr.philos., 1913). He became a senior lecturer at the University of Oslo in 1914, and was Professor of Geology there from 1920 to 1956.

Career 
Olaf Holtedahl was born in Kristiania (modern-day Oslo), Norway, the son of Arne H. Holtedahl, superintendent of pauper administration, and his wife, Mathilde Madsen.

Around 1903 he did his obligatory military service at Gardermoen, just north of Oslo, and here met Captain Gunnar Isachsen who greatly influenced him, and first inspired his interest in polar regions. In 1909, Isachsen invited Holtedahl to join him in explorations of Spitsbergen as official geologist of the group.

He studied Geology at the University of Oslo, graduating in 1909 and receiving a doctorate in 1913. Staying in the university as staff he received his professorship in 1920.
 
Holtedahl was among the last of a generation of geologists that mastered the subject in all its breadth. He delivered a significant contribution, not only in Norway but also for large areas of the Arctic and Antarctic. His first geological work dealt with the Oslo Rift in the Cambrosilurian period, and he was part of the 1909-11 expeditions to Svalbard. Between 1914-17, he explored the geology of Lapland, and in 1918, he worked at Bear Island. In 1921 he led a Norwegian expedition to Novaya Zemlya. He joined the 1927-28 Antarctic expeditions of Lars Christensen, and he edited the scientific results from these expeditions . He was the doctoral advisor of Bjørn G. Andersen, whose subsequent works on Quaternary geology he greatly influenced.

In the Second World War he was a member of the Norwegian resistance movement.

Holtedahl died in Oslo on 26 August 1975.

Family
He married Tora Gurstad in 1912. Their children include Professor of geology Hans Holtedahl (1917–2001).

Honors and awards
Wollaston Medal (1951)
Elected member of the Royal Society in 1961

References

External links 

Olaf Holtedahl: 24. juni 1885 — 26. august 1975, in the Norwegian Journal of Geography, Volume 30, Issue 1, 1976
Olaf Holtedahl 24. juni 1885 — 26. august 1975 Elected For Mem. R. S. 1961 by L. Størmer
Olaf Holtedahl Biography in Store Norske Leksikon
Olaf Holtedahl Biography at Norsk Polarhistorie
Geology of Norway: Maps in cooperation with Bjørn G. Andersen

Quaternary geologists
20th-century Norwegian geologists
Norwegian science writers
1885 births
1975 deaths
Wollaston Medal winners
Foreign Members of the Royal Society
Honorary Fellows of the Royal Society of Edinburgh
Members of the Royal Swedish Academy of Sciences